The 14th Racquetball World Championships were held in Kingscourt (Ireland) from August 2 to 9, 2008, with 22 men's national teams and 15 women's national teams; and several players in the Singles and Doubles competition.


Men's team competition

Women's team competition

Men's Singles Competition

Women's Singles Competition

Men's doubles competition

Women's doubles competition

See also
Racquetball World Championships

External links
Official website
Championships results
Men's Team Open Gold
Women's Team Open Gold
Men's Singles Open Gold
Women's Singles Open Gold
Historical results IRF website

Racquetball World Championships
Racquetball World Championships
Racquetball World Championships
International sports competitions hosted by Ireland
Racquetball in Ireland
Sport in County Cavan